Brachypteracias is a small genus of birds in the ground-roller family Brachypteraciidae. The genus is endemic to Madagascar.

Species 
There are two species:

 
Bird genera
Bird genera with one living species